Daniel Howard (born 13 December 1976) is a former Australian male volleyball player. He was part of the Australia men's national volleyball team. He competed with the national team at the 2000 Summer Olympics in Sydney, Australia and at the 2004 Summer Olympics in Athens, Greece. He played with Marmi Lanza Verona in 2004.

Clubs
  Marmi Lanza Verona (2004)

See also
 Australia at the 2000 Summer Olympics
 Australia at the 2004 Summer Olympics
 3 x World Championships in 1998, 2002 and 2006

References

External links
 

1976 births
Living people
Australian men's volleyball players
Place of birth missing (living people)
Volleyball players at the 2000 Summer Olympics
Volleyball players at the 2004 Summer Olympics
Olympic volleyball players of Australia